Bert Richardson may refer to:

Bert Richardson (footballer) (1887–1962), Australian rules footballer
Bert Richardson (judge) (born 1956), American judge on the Texas Court of Criminal Appeals
Bert Richardson, former Principal Secretary of Canada
Bert Richardson, candidate in Cumbria County Council election, 2013

See also
Albert Richardson (disambiguation)
Robert Richardson (disambiguation)
Herbert Richardson (disambiguation)
Hubert Richardson, California politician
Bertram Richardson, cricketer